Supply chain financing  (or reverse factoring) is a form of financial transaction wherein a third party facilitates an exchange by financing the supplier on the customer's behalf. Also it refers to the techniques and practices used by banks and other financial institutions to manage the capital invested into the supply chain and reduce risk for the parties involved.

Unlike traditional factoring (where a supplier wants to finance its receivables), supply chain financing is initiated by the ordering party (the customer) in order to help its suppliers to finance its receivables more easily and at a lower interest rate than what would normally be offered. In 2011, the reverse factoring market was still very small, accounting for less than 3% of the factoring market.

Method
The reverse factoring method, still rare, is similar to the factoring insofar as it involves three actors: the ordering party (customer), the supplier, and the factor. Just as basic factoring, the aim of the process is to finance the supplier's receivables by a financier (the factor), so the supplier can cash in the money for what they sold immediately (minus an interest the factor deducts to finance the advance of money).

Contrary to the basic factoring, the initiative is not from the supplier that would have presented invoices to the factor to be paid earlier. This time, it is the ordering party (customer) that starts the process – usually a large company – choosing invoices that they will allow to be paid earlier by the factor. And then, the supplier will themselves choose which of these invoices he will need to be paid by the factor. It is therefore a collaborative project between the ordering party, the supplier and the factor.

Because it is the ordering party that starts the process, it is their liability that is engaged and therefore the interest applied for the deduction is less than the one the supplier would have been given had they done it on their own. The ordering party will then benefit of a part of the benefit realized by the factor, because they are the one to allow this. And the financier for their part will make their profit and create a durable relation with both the supplier and the ordering party.

Reverse factoring is an effective cash flow optimization tool for companies outsourcing a large volume of services (e.g. clinical research activities by Pharmaceutical companies). The benefit to both parties is that the company providing the services can get the outstanding value of their invoices paid in 10 days or less vs. the normal 30- to 45-day payment terms while the ordering party can delay the actual payment of the invoices (which are paid to the bank) by 120–180 days thus increasing cash flow. After the initial period of cash flow optimization, it is unclear if this will remain of value to the ordering party because you will then be paying monthly invoices of approximately equal amounts assuming your outsourced services are stable/average across the year/future periods. The cost of the "money" is a set interest rate normally tied to an index plus a bps adjustment.

The concept 
To fully understand how the reverse factoring process works, one needs to be familiar with trade discounts and factoring. Indeed, reverse factoring could be considered as a combination of these two methods, taking advantages of both in order to redistribute the benefits to all three actors. In order to better understand the process, it is necessary to look at the 8 individual aspects of those three financing methods:

Historic
The concept of reverse factoring started with automobile constructors - including Fiat in the 1980s - who used this kind of financing process for its suppliers in order to realise a better margin. The principle then spread to the retail industry because of the interest it represents for a sector where payment delays are at the heart of every negotiation.

In the 1990s and the early 2000s, reverse factoring was not used extensively due to economic contexts that did not allow it to be an efficient way of financing.

Advantages

For the supplier 
The supplier has its invoices paid earlier; therefore it can more easily manage its cashflow, and reduce by the way the costs of receivables management. Moreover, as it is the ordering party that puts its liability at stake, it benefits from a better interest rate on the trade discount than the one that would have been obtained by going directly to a factoring company.
The reverse factoring is very useful for small companies that have large groups for clients, because it creates a more durable business relation as the big company helps the smaller one, and doing so gets some extra money.  This opinion does not account for the poor relations caused by unilateral changes to credit terms.  Smaller companies are generally not given a choice to accept the additional cost of finance imposed by this process.
In a factoring process, if there is any problem concerning the payment of the invoice, it is the supplier that is liable, and has to give back the money he received. In the reverse factoring process, as it concerns validated invoices, as soon as the supplier receives the payment from the factor, the company is protected. The factor will have to get its money from the ordering party.
Finally, in a trade discount system, the supplier is forced to be paid cash, regardless of its cash flow. Some reverse factoring platforms identified this problem, and therefore propose to the suppliers a more collaborative financing method: they choose themselves the invoices they want to receive cash, the others will be paid at due date.

For the ordering party (the buyer) 
The reverse factoring permits all the suppliers to be gathered in one financier, and that way to pay one company instead of many, which eases the invoicing management. The relation with the suppliers benefiting of the reverse factoring is improved because they benefit from better financing, and their payment delays are reduced; for its part, the ordering party will gain some extra money reversed by the factor and pay her invoices to the due date. Making suppliers benefit from such advantages can be a powerful leverage in negotiation, and also ensure a more durable relationship with the suppliers. Moreover, it ensures that the suppliers will be able to find advantaging financing in case of cash flow problem: using reverse factoring assures that the suppliers will still be in business, and are reliable.
With the reverse factoring, instead of paying numerous suppliers, most of the invoices are centralized with the same factor; it is always better for the accounts department to deal with one company to pay than several. This can also be simplified and speeded by using a reverse factoring platform combined with digitalization of business transactions (i.e. EDI).

For the factor (the financier) 
By taking part in the reverse factoring process, the factor realizes a benefit by making available cash to the supplier and supporting in its place the delays of payment. However, in opposition to the factoring, in this situation the factor is in a more durable business relation as everyone benefits from it.
Other advantage for the financier, is that he works directly with big ordering parties; it means that instead of going after each and every supplier of that company, he can reach faster and more easily all of the suppliers and do business with them. Therefore, the risk is less important: it passes from a lot of fragmented risks to one unique and less important.

Globalization
With the supply chain lengthening as a result of globalization and offshore production, many companies have experienced a reduction of capital availability. In addition, the pressure faced by companies to improve cash flow has resulted in increased pressure on their overseas suppliers. Specifically, suppliers receive pressure in the form of extended payment terms or increased working capital imposed on them by large buyers. The general trend toward open account from letters of credit has further contributed to the problem.

As a result, there is a need for global supply chain finance (GSCF). The market opportunity for a GSCF is significant. The total worldwide market for receivables management is US$1.3 trillion. Payables discounting and asset-based lending add an additional US$100 billion and $340 billion, respectively . Only a small percentage of companies are currently using supply chain finance techniques, but more than half have plans or are investigating options to improve supply chain finance techniques. In fact the market for supply chain finance has grown by 35% in volume in 2020 compared to 2019 reaching US$1,311bn. The amount of funds in use as at the end of 2020 is estimated at US$505bn, an increase of 42%.

While buyers are extending payment terms to their suppliers, the suppliers often have limited access to short-term financing and, therefore, a higher cost of money. This cost-shifting to suppliers results in a financially unstable and higher-risk supply base. Overall, the benchmark report showed that companies should be pursuing three key areas of improvement: GSCF financing; GSCF technology; and GSCF visibility.

Benefits of GSCF
The role of GSCF is to optimize both the availability and cost of capital within a given buyer-supplier supply chain. It does this by aggregating, packaging, and utilizing information generated during supply chain activities and matching this information with the physical control of goods. The coupling of information and physical control enables lenders to mitigate financial risk within the supply chain. The mitigation of risk allows more capital to be raised, capital to be accessed sooner or capital to be raised at lower rates.

The need to increase capital or inject capital into the supply chain more quickly is being caused by several factors:

1.) Market trends with respect to the global supply chain have caused companies to demand an integrated approach to physical and financial supply chain challenges: 
a.) Buyers are looking to optimize their balance sheet by delaying inventory ownership. 
b.) Suppliers are looking to obtain funds earlier in the supply chain at favorable rates, given buyers’ desire to delay inventory ownership. 
c.) middle-market companies are looking to monetize non-US domiciled inventory to increase liquidity. 
d.) There is wide interest in integrated supply chain finance methods.

2.) Globalization of the United States and Western Europe’s manufacturing bases has resulted in fewer domestic assets that can be leveraged to generate working capital.

3.) Most small and medium suppliers to US and European businesses are located in countries that lack well-developed capital markets. Without access to efficient and cost-effective capital, production costs increase significantly or the suppliers go out of business.

4.) Letters of credit, a long-standing method of obtaining capital for suppliers in less developed countries, are on the decline as large buyers are forcing suppliers to move to open account.

5.) There is a desire to ensure stability of capital as supply chains elongate. Another Asian financial crisis (such as the one in 1997) would severely disrupt US buyers’ supply chains by making capital unavailable to their suppliers.

An improvement of business relations 
In the basic invoicing or factoring framework, there are always some risks that threaten the invoices:
 inaccurate invoice (fraudulent, erroneous calculation, or typographical error)
 an underestimated time of payment delay
 an incorrect estimation on the object of the invoice (a service poorly executed)
 etc.

By using the reverse factoring, these risks are materially reduced.

Market size
Given the competitive nature of the GSCF market (approved payable finance) and due to the fact that business undertaken is covered by customer and bank confidentiality, sources of information regarding market size and players are constrained and not widely available in the public domain. As a result, indications on the market size are based mainly on estimates. The current, global market size for Supply Chain Finance is estimated at US$275 billion of annual traded volume, which translates in approximately $46 billion in outstandings with an average of 60 days payment terms. It is still relatively small compared to the market size of other invoice finance methods such as factoring, which remains the largest trade finance segment and is primarily domestic in focus. The potential market for Supply Chain Finance for the OECD (Organization for Economic Co-operation and Development) countries is significant and is estimated at $1.3 trillion in annual traded volume. The market serving European supply chains is approximately $600 billion. Based on these figures, the potential Supply Chain Finance market size for the US is estimated to be approximately $600 billion in traded volume per annum. A recent comprehensive research paper estimated that currently there are 200 GSCF programs of scale in place. These programs are run both domestically and cross-border and in multiple currencies. Still, the market potential is far from its capacity. If examining spending of large organizations, such as Lowe's $33 billion in spend, it becomes apparent that Supply Chain Finance programs usually require a multi-bank platform due to the credit and capital issues associated with banks.

Market growth
Market experts estimate that only 10% of the global available marketplace has been satisfied with Supply Chain Finance, revealing a large potential market for growth. The market is expected to continue to expand strongly in the coming years at a rate of approximately 20-30% per annum and 10% per annum by 2020.  The highest growth of supply chain finance programs currently originates from the US and Western Europe. Asia - India and China in particular, are considered the markets with most potential in the coming years.

The driving forces behind the rapid growth of supply chain finance programs are: 
Globalisation has increased the risk in supply chains and the impact on the financials of corporations. 
Working Capital Management has risen at the top of the CFOs’ and Treasurers’ agendas.
Strong interest from suppliers regarding the provision of liquidity and enabling lower financing costs.

Further growth potential - Challenges
Although Supply Chain Finance is experiencing significant growth in demand, financial institutions are focused mainly on the large buyer side of the trade equation. As structured finance has been traditionally engineered and provided by banks specifically for large international trading companies, they do not use common foundations. In order for Supply Chain Finance to take off on a broad scale, a fresh impetus is needed. A “tipping point” could easily be reached by solving the following challenges. 
On-boarding of Supplier. In a Supplier Financing program, the servicer needs to on board the buyer’s trading partners - the suppliers. The multitude of such platforms generates operational issues for suppliers wishing to benefit from various Supply Chain Finance offerings via their buyers’ funders.  
Know-Your-Customer (KYC). Most funders require KYC checks to be performed on suppliers being enlisted as new trading partners. This procedure not only increases the total processing cost, but it also puts the business case for all parties including the service provider, funder, buyer and ultimately the supplier at risk. 
Available Capital and Liquidity. With 90% of liquidity in Supply Chain Finance programs provided by large, global commercial banks, there is a large amount of trade assets, which cannot be covered by such financial institutions. Further regulations such as Basel III might impact the risk appetite and funding capacity of banks and make it more attractive for non-bank funders to step in and support Supply Chain Finance facilities. Limited to large buyers. Today’s Supply Chain Finance offerings are mainly addressing the large buyers with sound credit ratings whereas the real Supply Chain Finance opportunity extends to large suppliers too, in particular in terms of payment assurance and risk mitigation.  
Proprietary legal documentation.  Current Supply Chain Finance offerings use proprietary legal documentation, which makes the signing of non-standard agreements a costly, complex and time consuming process for corporate clients and their suppliers. Therefore, the market is currently facing challenges related to the absence of interoperability and legal standards. 
Standardized product definitions. The naming and definitions of the various Supply Chain Finance methods vary between suppliers, which makes it difficult for corporations to compare offerings and consider switching from one provider to another.

The role of the GSCF “translator”
Physical and informational control are the keys to a GSCF. There is a need for logistics providers and financial services firms to join together to develop precise visibility tools that provide CFOs and global supply chain managers with the data they need and lenders with the collateral security required to provide capital. In fact, according to a November 2006 study conducted by the Aberdeen Group, large companies are four times more likely to be planning to spend over US$500,000 in supply chain finance technology over the next 18 months. Once a robust information-based system is established, trading partners, logistics companies, and banks need to be able to access the information quickly and efficiently.

The starting point for information about goods being transported must be the entity that is transporting the goods – the supply chain services provider, transportation company, and/or logistics partner. These are the entities that have the physical control of the goods while in the supply chain. Access to this information is a must from a demand planning perspective. Knowing where the goods are in transit, the financial services provider can more confidently extend financing at various milestones within the supply chain.

There is a critical role missing in this equation, however, and that is the supply chain finance “translator” – the entity that is experienced in both logistics/transportation and financial services. The translator is the subject matter expert, if you will, that can bring all entities to the table – transportation and logistics; banks; buyers; and sellers and speak the various languages and understand the needs of each party. In addition to participating in the financial transaction, the translator can help bridge the information divide between the physical and financial worlds, providing critical analysis about the information being collected from the supply chain.

The following explains this translator role:

Global supply-chain finance sets
Some of the products that could be sold under the banner of Global Supply Chain Financing include, but are not limited to: 1.) Global asset-based lending (GABL) – Enables middle market companies to monetize off-shore or in-transit inventory. This results in increased liquidity to this class of borrower, 2.) Inventory finance – Enables companies that supply to large buyers to secure financing on inventory that they are required by buyers to hold. This results in an improvement in the net cash conversion cycle for the buyer while providing the supplier with capital at a reduced rate. 3.) Receivables management services – Provides third-party outsourcing of receivables management and collections process. It also provides financing of those receivables and guarantees on the payment of those receivables. 4.) Payables discounting -Provides third-party outsourcing of the payables process and leverages a buyer’s credit quality to obtain favorable financing rates for suppliers. This results in lower cost of capital for the supplier, a portion of which can be passed on to the buyer. 5) Insurance
– Further mitigates trade risk through cargo, credit, and transaction dispute insurance.

Because of the complexities surrounding the sharing and transferring of data, the need to physically control the goods, and to maintain visibility throughout the fulfillment supply chain, transportation and logistics providers such as UPS [UPS Corporation] have unique capabilities to support and provide SCF services to global organizations due to their access to the shipping data and capabilities as a lender. In these unique situations, UPS as a translator can participate in the lending as well as collaborate with other lenders in helping to extract costs from the supply chain and ensure that the physical and financial supply chains are synchronized.

Traditionally, dynamic payables discounting, the early payment of trade payables in advance of the invoice due date, has been only related to invoices that are already approved. Given these discounted payments are paid post-goods receipt and approval, they don't carry any transaction risk which is common in cross border trade. Given the complexities of modern financing and payment techniques, invoicement including invoice automation and discount management initiatives need a framework to ensure that programs are approached on a strategic basis which bridges the supply chain, purchasing, accounts payable and finance organizations. Examples of providers are Misys TI Plus, TradeCard, Demica and Manhattan Associates.

More recently, there has been a pivot back to Receivables Financing Factoring (finance) programs, primarily driven by enhancements in technology which has increased the efficiency and attractiveness of Receivables-based programs. In a Supplier Financing model there is a heavy administrative burden caused by the need to negotiate Receivables Purchase Agreements with each individual Supplier, whereas in Factoring (finance) programs only one RPA is required with the Vendor. In addition, traditionally there was a larger effort involved in calculating the Funders credit risk exposure in a Receivables-based program due to the many Buyers which needed to be credit evaluated on an ongoing basis. Technology has now automated much of the credit evaluation process allowing program Funders access to real-time Buyer risk ratings across their portfolio. This transparency generates increased credit appetites from program Funders and Credit Insurers and benefits the Vendor through attractive rates and increased program credit limits on their Buyers. Vendors can also use the receivables-based approach to increase competitiveness by extending payment terms to their Buyers Off-balance-sheet. Examples of providers include Global Supply Chain Finance Ltd.

Structures
Supply Chain Finance practices have been in place for over a decade. Three distinctive Supply Chain Finance structures have crystallized.  
Buyer managed platforms. In this structure the buyer owns and runs the Supply ChainFinance platform. Some large retailers such as Carrefour or Metro Group are using this structure and managing the finance program, supplier onboarding, and liquidity themselves. 
Bank proprietary platforms. The Supply Chain Finance structure is managed by large commercial banks providing the technology platform, services and funding. This structure is used by several large buying organizations such as Carlsberg, Boeing, Marks & Spencer and Procter & Gamble.  
Multi-bank platforms.  The structure that has exhibited the strongest growth rate is represented by independent third party supply chain finance providers offering multi-bank platforms. This structure separates the entities, which manage the platform – a specialised service provider, from the funding partner, which provides liquidity and takes the credit risk. Based on the fact that funding in Supply Chain Finance is uncommitted, no bank can fund in every jurisdiction or currency and due to the general limitations in terms of credit risk appetite and funder concentration risk.
Market share. In terms of market share, programs are serviced and funded by a handful of players including large commercial banks. Together they manage over 40% of the market share. The rest of the Supply Chain Finance is serviced and funded by a variety of local banks and smaller, independent service providers.

Optimization of the process
Often the reverse factoring is used with the dematerialization to speed the process. As the whole goal of it is to make money available to the supplier as fast as possible, a lot of companies decide to dematerialize their invoices when they start a reverse factoring system, because that way it saves few more days, plus all the advantages of the dematerialization (less expensive, and benefic to the environment). In average, it can shorten the delays by 10 to 15 days.

Reverse factoring choice
The core principle of the reverse factoring is to have a way that benefits to all the actors. That way, it is necessary to have good relations with the other actors. The principal risk in reverse factoring is that the supplier gets trapped in a system where he cannot decide which invoices he need paid immediately or not, and therefore he becomes the victim of that system. Therefore, it is necessary to choose a collaborative platform that would permit the supplier to select which invoices they will be paid early, and when they will be paid.

See also 
 Factoring (finance)
 Paperless office

References 

Corporate finance
Supply chain management
Working capital management
Financial services
Global business organization